The Men's Cathay Pacific Hong Kong Open 2011 is the men's edition of the 2011 Hong Kong Open, which is a PSA World Series event Platinum (Prize money: $150,000). The event took place in Hong Kong from 15 to 20 November. James Willstrop won his first Hong Kong Open trophy, beating Karim Darwish in the final.

Prize money and ranking points
For 2011, the prize purse was $150,000. The prize money and points breakdown is as follows:

Seeds

Draw and results

See also
Hong Kong Open (squash)
Women's Hong Kong squash Open 2011
2011 Men's World Open Squash Championship
PSA World Tour 2011
PSA World Series 2011

References

External links
PSA Cathay Pacific Hong Kong Open 2011 website
hksquash.org.hk Cathay Pacific Hong Kong Open 2011 official website
Cathay Pacific Hong Kong Open 2011 Squash Site website

Squash tournaments in Hong Kong
Men's Hong Kong Open (squash)
Men's Hong Kong Open (squash)